The list is arranged by the governors' respective colonial powers.

Egypt
 Sudan – Charles George Gordon, Governor-General of the Sudan (1880–1885)

Portugal
 Angola – António Eleutério Dantas, Governor-General of Angola (1880–1882)

United Kingdom
 Bahamas –  Jeremiah Thomas Fitzgerald Callaghan, Governor of the Bahamas (1880–1881)
 Hong Kong - Sir John Pope Hennessy, Governor of Hong Kong (1877-1882)
 India – George Robinson, Viceroy of India (1880–1884)
 Jamaica – Sir Anthony Musgrave, Governor of Jamaica (1877–1883)
 Malta Colony – Arthur Borton, Governor of Malta (1878–1884)
 New South Wales – Lord Augustus Loftus, Governor of New South Wales (1879–1885)
 Queensland – Sir Arthur Kennedy, Governor of Queensland (1877–1883)
 Tasmania – Major George Strahan, Governor of Tasmania (1881–1886)

 Saint Lucia - Sir Roger Goldsworthy, Administrator of Saint Lucia (1881–1884)

 South Australia – Lieutenant-General William Jervois, Governor of South Australia (1877–1883)
 Victoria – George Phipps, Lord Normanby, Governor of Victoria (1879–1884)
 Western Australia – Sir William Robinson, Governor of Western Australia (1880–1883)

References

Colonial governors
Colonial governors
1881